Arctia alpina is a moth of the  family Erebidae. It is found in northern Scandinavia, northern Siberia, high mountains of southern Siberia and northern Mongolia; also in Alaska and northwestern Canada.

Its wingspan is 42–50 mm.

The larvae feed on Taraxacum officinale, Vaccinium and Salix herbacea.

This species was formerly a member of the genus Acerbia, but was moved to Arctia along with the other species of the genera Acerbia, Pararctia, Parasemia, Platarctia, and Platyprepia.

Subspecies
Arctia alpina alpina
Arctia alpina johanseni (O. Bang-Haas, 1927) 
Arctia alpina severa Saldaitis & Ivinskis, 2004 (Kodar Mountains in Siberia)
Arctia alpina siberica O. Bang-Haas, 1927 (Siberia)

References

External links 

Lepiforum.de
Species info

Arctiina
Moths of North America
Moths of Europe
Moths of Asia
Moths described in 1802
Taxa named by Conrad Quensel